plus 44 may refer to:
+44, the country calling code for telephone numbers in the United Kingdom
+44, an alternative rock band based in the United States